VSEL may refer to:
 Vickers Shipbuilding and Engineering
 Very Small Embryonic-Like stem cells – hypothetical murine and human stem cells